Viktor Noring (born 3 February 1991) is a Swedish footballer who plays as a goalkeeper for Danish Superliga club AGF.

Club career

Husie IF
Born in Malmö, Noring began his career with Husie IF, a local club from Malmö having their first team in the seven tier league.

Trelleborgs FF
Noring was spotted as a gigantic talent by Trelleborgs FF, a club well known for their ability to develop promising keepers. The club signed him in 2006 and Noring was playing in the youth team. This continued until the start of season 2009. The club had seen departures of Marcus Sahlman and Johan Dahlin and many thought they would buy in a new keeper. Instead, they gave Noring, at the time 18 years old, full confidence to prove that he was ready for the first team. In his first season, he played 29 out of 30 games, conceding 32, having 8 clean sheets. He also had a saving percentage of 78% (5th in the league). After that season he was voted as the rookie of the year.

In the beginning of 2010, Noring got an injury and Trelleborg were struggling against relegation. After 8 matches, he was back again. As of 1 August 2010, he had played 8 games, conceding 7, having 2 clean sheets and a saving percentage of 82%. In January, Noring was on trial at Fulham, this led to the London club making an offer which was subsequently rejected by Trelleborg.

Malmö FF
On 20 February 2012 Noring went on loan to Allsvenskan club Malmö FF. The loan contract ended on 20 August 2012. Noring didn't make any appearances for the team during the loan period.

Celtic FC
Noring signed a five-month loan deal with Scottish side Celtic on 31 January 2013. The deal included an option for Celtic to make the transfer permanent for an undisclosed sum.

Bodø/Glimt
Celtic chose to not use their option to buy Noring. He then trained with his old club Malmö FF during the summer, before he joined the Norwegian First Division side Bodø/Glimt in August 2013. He played a total of nine matches during the 2013 season when Bodø/Glimt won promotion to the Tippeligaen.

SC Heerenveen
On 4 April 2014 it was announced that Norling signed for the Dutch club SC Heerenveen to join fellow Swedish goalkeeper Kristoffer Nordfeldt for the 2014–15 season. The contract signed was a two-year deal.

Lyngby BK
On 9 July 2015 he decided to move to the Danish side Lyngby BK, after a year without any minutes in the first team at SC Heerenveen.

Hearts
Noring signed a two-year contract with Scottish club Heart of Midlothian in July 2016. He mostly served Hearts as a backup goalkeeper, making only three appearances for the club. He made his debut in May 2017, but committed an error as Hearts lost 2–1 to Rangers. Noring left Hearts by mutual consent in March 2018.

International career
Noring has four caps for the Swedish under-21 team. His debut came in a friendly game against Portugal on 2 March 2010. Sweden won the game 2–0.

Noring made his debut for Sweden on 22 January 2011 in a friendly game against South Africa Development team.

Career statistics

References

External links
Malmö FF profile 

 

1991 births
Living people
Footballers from Skåne County
Swedish footballers
Swedish expatriate footballers
Sweden under-21 international footballers
Sweden international footballers
Association football goalkeepers
Trelleborgs FF players
Malmö FF players
Landskrona BoIS players
Kalmar FF players
Celtic F.C. players
FK Bodø/Glimt players
SC Heerenveen players
Lyngby Boldklub players
Falkenbergs FF players 
Heart of Midlothian F.C. players
Aarhus Gymnastikforening players
Scottish Professional Football League players
Allsvenskan players
Superettan players
Norwegian First Division players
Eredivisie players
Danish 1st Division players
Swedish expatriate sportspeople in the United Kingdom
Swedish expatriate sportspeople in Norway
Swedish expatriate sportspeople in Denmark
Swedish expatriate sportspeople in Scotland
Swedish expatriate sportspeople in the Netherlands
Expatriate footballers in the Netherlands
Expatriate men's footballers in Denmark
Expatriate footballers in Scotland
Expatriate footballers in Norway